Arda Collins is an American poet and winner of the Yale Series of Younger Poets Competition.

Life
Collins was born in New York. She is a graduate of the Iowa Writers' Workshop, where she was a Glenn Schaeffer Fellow, and the University of Denver, where she received a Ph.D. in poetry.

Her book It Is Daylight was selected by Louise Glück for the Yale Series of Younger Poets.

She has taught at the University of Massachusetts Amherst, New York University, and at Victoria University in Wellington, New Zealand. She is currently the Grace Hazard Conkling Writer in Residence at Smith College. She lives in Amherst, Massachusetts.

Her poems have been published in journals and magazines including The New Yorker, jubilat, The American Poetry Review, A Public Space and Gutcult.

Awards 
 2008 winner of the Yale Series of Younger Poets competition.
 2008 American Academy of Arts and Sciences' (AAAS) Poetry Prize
 2008 May Sarton Prize

Works 
 It is daylight, New Haven : Yale University Press, 2009. ,

References

Iowa Writers' Workshop alumni
Living people
Year of birth missing (living people)
Place of birth missing (living people)
American women poets
Yale Younger Poets winners
American writers of Armenian descent
21st-century American women